Opatów  is a village in Kłobuck County, Silesian Voivodeship, in southern Poland. It is the seat of the gmina (administrative district) called Gmina Opatów.

The village has a population of 1,213.
Main road connections from the Opatów include those with Wieluń and Częstochowa via the National Road .

References

Villages in Kłobuck County